The Statue of Krishna is a 51 foot 60 ton bronze and copper statue of the major Hindu deity Krishna in Saifai, Uttar Pradesh, India.

Description 
The statue depicts Krishna wielding a chariot wheel as a weapon during the Kurukshetra War from the Indian epic poem The Mahābhārata. The statue was funded by the Saifai Mahotsav committee. It was designed by New Delhi based artist Edward Breathitt.

References

External links
Project gallery

Krishna in art
K
Buildings and structures in Etawah district
Bronze sculptures in India
Saifai
Tourist attractions in Etawah district
K
Proposed infrastructure in Uttar Pradesh